Ballymun Kickhams (Irish: Ciceam Bhaile Munna ) is a GAA club in Ballymun, Dublin, Ireland. The club has a clubhouse and its home pitch, Pairc Ciceam, just off the Ballymun (junction 4) exit of the M50. Ballymun also has a full size astroturf pitch. The club derives its name from Charles Joseph Kickham (1828–1882). They last won the Dublin Senior Football Championship in 2020.

History

The club was set up in 1969 following the merging of two clubs, Ballymun Gaels and C.J. Kickhams. Senior status was first achieved in 1978 when Ballymun Kickhams beat Fingal Ravens in the Intermediate league final. In 1981 Ballymun made it to their first Dublin Senior Football Championship Final. The club's Intermediate team participated in the 2010 RTÉ series Celebrity Bainisteoir, with Today FM's Maireád Farrell.

Ballymun Kickhams won their first Dublin Football Championship in 1982, won their second in 1985 before claiming their third in 2012. Ballymun claimed the Division 1 league title in 1983, 1984, 1987, 1988 and, most recently, in 2009. On Sunday 9 December 2012, Ballymun Kickhams won their first Leinster Senior Football Final, defeating Portlaoise, in Mullingar.

In 2011, the U14 Ballymun Kickhams team won the All Ireland Division 1 Féile for the first time in the club's history.

In March 2013, Ballymun Kickhams reached the All-Ireland Senior Club Football Final, a game which Roscommon GAA club St Brigid's won.

In 2015, the Ballymun minor team, managed by former Dublin senior footballer, Paddy Christie, won a historic treble. They won the Minor 'A' Football Championship, Division 1 League Title and Leinster Minor Football Championship.

As the COVID-19 pandemic emerged in 2020, Brendan Hackett was Ballymun Kickhams coach. He led the club to the 2020 Dublin Senior Football Championship. As of 2022, Hackett was still managing the club.

Notable players

Paddy Christie
Evan Comerford
Dermot Deasy
Gerry Hargan
Kevin Leahy
James McCarthy
John McCarthy
Gerry McCaul
Philly McMahon
Ian Robertson
Barney Rock
Dean Rock
John Small
Paddy Small

Managers

Honours
 All-Ireland Senior Club Football Championship runner-up: 2013
 Leinster Senior Club Football Championship winner: 2012-13; runner-up: 1982-83
 Dublin Senior Football Championship winner (4): 1982, 1985, 2012, 2020
 Dublin AFL Division 1 winner: 1983, 1984, 1987, 1988, 2009, 2019
 Dublin Intermediate Football Championship winner: 1979
 Dublin Junior B Football Championship winner: 2016
 Dublin Under 21 A Football Championship (6): 1990, 1991, 1996, 2007, 2008, 2018
 Dublin Under 21 B Football Championship (1): 2013
 Dublin Minor A Football Championship (5) 1951, 1952, 1953 (as Kickhams), 1977, 2015
 Dublin AFL Div. 4 winner: 2014
 Dublin AFL Div. 6 winner: 2017

References

External links
 

 
Ballymun
Gaelic games clubs in Dublin (city)
Gaelic football clubs in Dublin (city)
Hurling clubs in Dublin (city)